Pachakuthira is a 2006 Indian Malayalam-language comedy drama film directed by Kamal and written by T. A. Shahid from a story by Dileep, starring Dileep in dual role and Gopika and Salim Kumar in supporting role.

Plot
Anandakkuttan, a junior artist in movies takes up a responsibility to look after his long-lost German brother, Akash Menon. However, as Akash is autistic and mentally disabled, he causes trouble to everyone around him, including the neighbors. Initially Anandakkuttan finds the troublesome Akash annoying and hates him, but ultimately develops love and deep connection towards Akash.

Cast

Soundtrack
All songs were written by Gireesh Puthenchery and composed by Ilaiyaraaja.

"Oru Thottaavaadi" - Jyotsna Radhakrishnan, Vijay Yesudas	
"Kalikonda" -	MG Sreekumar
"Butterfly" -	Bhavatharani, Karthik	Gireesh Puthenchery
"Varavelkkumo" - Madhu Balakrishnan, Jyotsna Radhakrishnan

References

External links
 

2000s Malayalam-language films
2006 comedy-drama films
2006 films
Films scored by Ilaiyaraaja
Films about autism
Films about disability in India
2006 comedy films
2006 drama films
Indian comedy-drama films
Films directed by Kamal (director)